Çüdüllü (also, Çudulu, Chudullu, Chudulo, and Chudulu) is a village in the Qakh Rayon of Azerbaijan.

References 

Populated places in Qakh District